Stanisław Przybylski (1 January 1931 – 1 January 2010) was a Polish modern pentathlete. He competed at the 1960 Summer Olympics.

References

1931 births
2010 deaths
Polish male modern pentathletes
Olympic modern pentathletes of Poland
Modern pentathletes at the 1960 Summer Olympics
People from Sosnowiec
Sportspeople from Silesian Voivodeship